Edward Barton is a former association football player who represented New Zealand at international level.

Barton made a single appearance in an official international for the All Whites in a 2–4 loss to Australia on 5 June 1933.

Barton was only the third player to score a hat-trick in the final of the Chatham Cup, putting three goals past the Millerton All Blacks goalkeeper in the 1932 Chatham Cup final.

References 

Year of birth missing
Possibly living people
New Zealand association footballers
New Zealand international footballers
Association football forwards